Banking Agency of the Federation of Bosnia and Herzegovina is a state agency of Federation of Bosnia and Herzegovina responsible for bank regulations. 

Banking Agency of the FBiH (FBA) has given its full contribution to the banking sector reform. As an independent, sovereign and non-profit authority for bank supervision and licensing. Its work, since the very beginning, has been directed towards a strong and stable banking, micro-credit and leasing system leasing system, as market-oriented and based on the international standards of performance and supervision of banks, micro-credit organizations and leasing companies.

See also 
 Konvertibilna marka
 Economy of Bosnia and Herzegovina
 Central Bank of Bosnia and Herzegovina

References

External links 
 

Banking in Bosnia and Herzegovina